Scrub turpentine is a common name for several plants and may refer to:

Canarium australianum, native to Australia and Papua New Guinea
Rhodamnia rubescens, native to eastern Australia

See also
 Turpentine bush
 Turpentine tree